Ureaplasma felinum is a species of Ureaplasma, a genus of bacteria belonging to the family Mycoplasmataceae. It has been isolated from cats. It possesses the sequence accession no. (16S rRNA gene) for the type strain: D78651.

References

External links
Type strain of Ureaplasma felinum at BacDive -  the Bacterial Diversity Metadatabase

felinum